This page provides the summaries of the matches of the qualifying rounds for the group stage of the 2010 African Women's Championship. These matches also served as part of the qualifiers for the 2011 FIFA Women's World Cup to be held in Germany.

A total of 23 national teams entered qualification which has held over two rounds.  In the preliminary round, the 18 lowest-ranked nations were drawn in pairs. The nine winners joined five other national teams in the first round, where the seven winners qualified for the finals.

Preliminary round
The matches in the preliminary round were held on 6–7 March 2010 (first leg) and 19–21 March 2010 (second leg).

Summary

|}

Matches

 
Algeria advanced to the first round after Egypt withdrew.

 

 
Namibia won 3 – 2 on aggregate and advanced to the first round.

 

 
Congo DR won 7 – 2 on aggregate and advanced to the first round.

 

 
Senegal won 1 – 0 on aggregate and advanced to the first round.

 

 
Ivory Coast won 5 – 2 on aggregate and advanced to the first round.

 

 
Guinea won 4 – 3 on aggregate and advanced to the first round.

 
Mali advanced to the first round after Togo withdrew.

 

 
Tanzania won 4 – 2 on aggregate and advanced to the first round.

 
Eritrea advanced to the first round after Kenya withdrew.

First round
The first round was scheduled to be held on 21–23 May 2010 (first leg) and 4–6 June 2010 (second leg).

Summary

|}

Matches

 

 
Algeria won 2 – 1 on aggregate and advanced to the final tournament.

 

 
Equatorial Guinea  advanced to the final tournament after Namibia were forced to withdraw prior to the second leg.

 

 
Cameroon won 5 – 0 on aggregate and advanced to the final tournament.

 

 
Ghana won 4 – 0 on aggregate and advanced to the final tournament.

 

 
Nigeria won 5 – 2 on aggregate and advanced to the final tournament.

 

 
Mali won 3 – 2 on aggregate and advanced to the final tournament.

 

 
Tanzania won 11 – 4 on aggregate and advanced to the final tournament.

Notes

References

External links

qualification
2010 in women's association football
2010 in African football
2010